Nicole Lai (26 February 1974 in Penang – 6 September 2008) was a Singapore-based Malaysian Chinese singer-songwriter, backing vocalist, vocal trainer and performer.  Her nickname  was given to her by her good friend and singer-songwriter, Stefanie Sun. This nickname simply means "You! Come over here!" in English.

Biography

Professional qualification and training
Nicole had London College of Music Grade 8 (Distinction) qualification and also had undergone modelling training at Mannequin Studio and had received a diploma from Plato Make-Up Academy. Nicole studied vocals in Los Angeles under Jodi Sellards, who has taught David Tao, A-mei (Zhang Hui Mei) and Alex To (Du De Wei).

Vocal instructor, backing vocalist
Nicole has worked with many famous celebrities including Aaron Kwok, Jolin Tsai, Gigi Leung, Sammi Cheng, Jeff Chang, Karen Mok, Na Ying and Stefanie Sun. She has done backup vocals for albums by: Stefanie Sun, Gigi Leung, Sammi Cheng, Aaron Kwok, Jolin Tsai, and also has done live backup vocals for Julia Peng and Eric Moo. Nicole was one of the most experienced instructors in Singapore. Beside being a freelance instructor, she also taught at Lee Wei Song School of Music and Ocean Butterflies. She has taught many famous celebrities, including Stefanie Sun, Niki Wu, Huang Yida, Xiao Su Shen. She was also the vocal coach of MediaCorp Artistes including Zoe Tay, Tay Ping Hui, Christopher Lee and Constance Song.

Awards, judges
Nicole was a member of the Composers and Authors Society of Singapore (COMPASS). In 2003, she won awards for her own composition "" ("Dreamer") in the Xinyao Song competition held in Singapore where she was champion in the Vocal Performance Category and 1st runner up in the Composing Category. This song was later featured in the Taiwanese TV series Green Forest, My Home soundtrack album. Nicole also sang on the soundtrack of Singapore's own home-grown movie, Singapore Dreaming "Mei Man Ren Sheng". Nicole also made appearances on television as one of the judges for MediaCorp TV Channel 8's weekend variety show, PSC Nite 2005 and MediaCorp TV Channel U's 2008 S-POP HURRAY song writing competition show.

Commercial performer, charity work
Nicole was also an avid performer herself, having performed at countless Dinner and Dance events, Family Days, Singapore Town Council events and many other occasions. She has done many jingles including those of Hazeline Snow, Singapore Airlines, McDonald's, Canon, Slimwater and Knife Oil. Under the World Vision Organization child sponsorship programme, Nicole sponsored four kids when she was alive. After her death, her friends launched her EP album at the end of 2008 and proceeds from the CD sales will go to charity and to adopting Nicole's four kids from World Vision.

Discography

Songwriter
Nicole was also a songwriting enthusiast, and recently had one of her songs published in Stefanie Sun's album. Nicole was also a member of the Composers and Authors Society of Singapore (COMPASS), and had songs published in Stefanie Sun's, Maggie Tang's, Vivian Hsu's, Linda and Taiwanese TV series Green Forest, My Home soundtrack album. Nicole's own composition of "" title was renamed to "一" ("One's Star Light") and sung by William So.

Albums
Before her death, she wrote the song " – Freedom" which carries a special messages from her –
"Freedom is a choice in life. We are all free to make our choices in life, and even if we decide not to make any choice, that in itself is our freedom to choose" ~~With Love...nL.

Many local singer-songwriters attended her CD launch at Lunar on 23 April 2008. They include Lee Wei Song, Lee Shih Shiong, Jim Lim, Kenn C., Wu JiaMing, Ruth Ling, both Peng ChiSheng and Aaron Lim of Intune Music School, Radio DJ Luo Bang Qiang and many of her vocal students too. The CD was sponsored by Stefanie Sun and was given to friends during her wake. Another remembrance EP album is released in September 2009.

Record producer
One of Singapore largest entertainment complex, St James Power Station decided to produce an EP album for their Dragonfly Performers in August 2007. Nicole was consulted for this project. In her own premise at Tiong Bahru, she personally trained the performers to ensure everybody is studio ready. The EP album was released by Sony BMG in October 2007. The song that Nicole produced was one of the best track audience selected.

References

External links
 Official MySpace of Nicole Lai – Last login 29 June 2008
 2003 Xinyao Competition – Semi Final
 2005 Xinyao Competition
 Li Yun He
 Lucas Events
 SoMA – School of Music and the Arts
 InTune Music School

Celebrity response blogs pertaining Nicole's death

 Hong Kong actress Nnadia Chan
 MediaCorp Actor Tay Ping Hui
 Singapore singer Kelly Poon
 Sherlyn Xue Ling
 Shao Suan Low

1974 births
2008 deaths
Malaysian people of Chinese descent
Mandopop singer-songwriters
Singaporean Mandopop singers
People from Penang
Singaporean composers
20th-century Singaporean women singers